The Dugdemona River (pronounced dug-duh-mona) is a  tributary of the Little River in north-central Louisiana in the United States.  Via the Little, Ouachita and Red rivers, it is part of the watershed of the Mississippi River.

The Dugdemona River rises west of Simsboro in western Lincoln Parish, and flows generally southeastwardly through Bienville, Jackson, Winn and Grant parishes, through a portion of the Kisatchie National Forest. A short tributary known as the Little Dugdemona River flows southwestwardly through Jackson and Bienville parishes. 
At Joyce, LA, the river has a mean annual discharge of 835 cubic feet per second.

Variant names and spellings
According to the Geographic Names Information System, the Dugdemona River has also been known historically as:

See also
List of Louisiana rivers

References

Rivers of Louisiana
Rivers of Bienville Parish, Louisiana
Rivers of Grant Parish, Louisiana
Rivers of Jackson Parish, Louisiana
Rivers of Lincoln Parish, Louisiana
Rivers of Winn Parish, Louisiana
Tributaries of the Red River of the South